Last of the Summer Wine's twentieth series aired on BBC One. All of the episodes were written by Roy Clarke and produced and directed by Alan J. W. Bell.

Outline
The trio in this series consisted of:

First appearances

Billy Hardcastle (1999–2006)

List of Episodes
Regular series

Special (1999)

DVD release
The box set for series twenty was released by Universal Playback in March 2012, mislabelled as a box set for series 21 & 22.

References

See also
 List of Last of the Summer Wine episodes

Last of the Summer Wine series
1999 British television seasons